Lautaro Federico Di Lollo (born 10 March 2004, Buenos Aires) is an Argentine professional footballer who plays for Boca Juniors and the Argentina national under-20 football team as a defender.

Career
He signed his first professional contract with Boca in July 2022, a four-year contract until 2026. The defender made the substitute bench of the first team match day squad in 2022 for matches against Estudiantes, Argentinos Juniors and Talleres. In October 2022 Di Lollo scored as Boca won the 2022 Reserve Team title.

International career
He was named in the Argentina under-20 squad by Javier Mascherano for the 2023 South American U-20 Championship held in Colombia in January and February 2023.

References

External links

2004 births
Living people
Argentine footballers
Sportspeople from Buenos Aires Province
Association football defenders
Argentina youth international footballers